Alan Ward may refer to:
Sir Alan Ward (born 1938), former judge of the Court of Appeal of England and Wales
Alan Ward (cricketer) (born 1947), former English cricketer
Alan Ward (historian) (1935–2014), New Zealand historian
Alan Howard Ward (1925–2021), British physicist